The Dana family is a Boston Brahmin family that arrived in Cambridge, Massachusetts from England during the later end of the Puritan migration to New England (1620–1640).

Richard Dana, immigrant

The patriarch, Richard Dana (16201690) was said to have been born in France.  A Huguenot, he would have fled to England as a result of the Edict of Restitution of 1629, and subsequently emigrated to New England, settling in Cambridge, Massachusetts by 1640. However there is no evidence that any Dana was among the Huguenots that fled to England, and there was a Richard Dana born in Manchester, England in 1617 who is the right age and disappears from English records before Richard Dana arrives in Cambridge. 

In Cambridge, he served numerous posts in the local government, including selectman, constable, tythingman, and grand juror. He married Ann Bullard about 1648. The couple had fourteen children, all born in Cambridge:
 John (1649–1650) 
 Hannah (1651–1728), baptized as Anne, married Samuel Oldham
 Samuel (1653–1653)
 Jacob (1654–1698), married Patience Sabin
 Joseph (1656–1700), married Mary Gobell. Abiah's twin brother.
 Abiah (1656–1668), Joseph's twin brother. 
 Benjamin (1660–1738), married Mary Buckminster. 
 Elizabeth (1662–1702), married Daniel Woodward. Unlike her siblings, she moved to Connecticut. 
 Daniel (1663–1749), married Naomi Croswell. Most of the famous Danas of Massachusetts come from Daniel Dana. 
 Deliverance (1667–1741), married Samuel Hyde. 
 Sarah (1669–1669)

Notable Danas descended from Richard Dana
 Amasa Dana (1792-1867), US Representative
 Charles A. Dana (philanthropist) (1881–1975): businessman, politician, philanthropist, founder of the Dana Foundation and Dana Holding Corporation
 Charles Anderson Dana (1819–1897): journalist, author, assistant Secretary of War (1864-1866)
Charles Loomis Dana (1852–1935): neurologist at Cornell Medical College
 Charles R. Dana (1802–1868): Mormon leader and politician
 Charles S. Dana (1862–1939): Speaker of the Vermont House of Representatives
 Daniel Dana (1771–1859): president of Dartmouth College
 Edmund Trowbridge Dana (1818–1869): jurist
 Edward Salisbury Dana (1849–1935): mineralogist, physicist 
 Francis Dana (1743–1811): member of the Continental Congress, signer of the Articles of Confederation
 Henry Dana (1820-1852): established the Native Police Corps of the Port Phillip District (later Victoria )
 James Dana (clergyman) (1735–1812): pastor of the First Church in New Haven
 James Dana (mayor) (1811–1890): mayor of Charlestown, Massachusetts
 James Dwight Dana (1813–1895): geologist, mineralogist, zoologist, volcanologist 
 John Cotton Dana (1856–1929): librarian and museum director
 John W. Dana (1808–1867): Governor of Maine
 Joseph Dana (1742–1827): clergyman
 Judah Dana (1772–1845): US Senator
 Lowell Dana (1891–1937): college football coach
 Napoleon J.T. Dana (1822–1905): American general during the Civil War and the Mexican–American War
 Olive E. Dana (1859–?): author
 Paul Dana (journalist) (1852–1930): journalist
 Richard Dana (lawyer) (1699–1772): colonial Boston politician, a founder of the Sons of Liberty
 Richard Henry Dana, Sr. (1787–1879): lawyer, poet, critic
 Richard Henry Dana, Jr. (1815–1882): lawyer, politician, author (Two Years Before the Mast)
 Richard Henry Dana III (1851–1931): lawyer, civil service reformer, husband of Henry Wadsworth Longfellow's daughter
 Samuel Dana (1767–1835): US Representative
 Samuel Dana (clergyman) (1739–1798): clergyman, judge, politician
 Samuel Luther Dana (1795–1868): chemist
 Samuel W. Dana (1760–1830): US Senator and US Representative 
 William Goodwin Dana (1798-1858): Sea Captain
 William Parsons Winchester Dana (1833 -1927) International impressionist painter

Other notable descendants:
 Charles Dana Gibson (1867–1944): graphic artist, created the "Gibson Girl"
 Samuel Dana Bell (1798–1868): politician and judge
 Samuel Newell Bell (1829–1889): US Representative
 William Dana Ewart (1851-1908): Inventor of the Link Belt and founder of the Link-Belt Construction Equipment Company
 Samuel Dana Greene (1839-1884) US Naval Officer

See also
 Boston Brahmin
 Dana

References

People from Cambridge, Massachusetts
American families of English ancestry
People of colonial Massachusetts
Boston Brahmins